Maria Toumazou (born 18 October 1992) is a Cypriot footballer who plays as a defender for Cypriot First Division club Lefkothea Latsion and the Cyprus women's national team.

Club career
Toumazou has played for Lefkothea in Cyprus.

International career
Toumazou has been capped for the Cyprus national team, appearing for the team during the UEFA Women's Euro 2021 qualifying cycle.

See also
List of Cyprus women's international footballers

References

External links
 

1992 births
Living people
Cypriot women's footballers
Women's association football defenders
Cyprus women's international footballers